Wild Gold is a 1934 American romance film directed by George Marshall and written by Lester Cole and Henry Johnson. The film stars John Boles, Claire Trevor, Harry Green, Roger Imhof, Ruth Gillette, Monroe Owsley and Edward Gargan. The film was released on June 8, 1934, by Fox Film Corporation.

Plot

Cast
John Boles as Steve Miller
Claire Trevor as Jerry Jordan
Harry Green as J. 'Jake' Lorillard Pushkin
Roger Imhof as James 'Pop' Benson
Ruth Gillette as Dixie Belle
Monroe Owsley as Walter Jordan
Edward Gargan as Eddie Sparks
Suzanne Kaaren as One of the Golden Girls
Wini Shaw as One of the Golden Girls
Blanca Vischer as One of the Golden Girls
Elsie Larson as One of the Golden Girls
Gloria Roy as One of the Golden Girls
Myrla Bratton as One of the Golden Girls

References

External links 
 

1934 films
Fox Film films
American romance films
1930s romance films
Films directed by George Marshall
American black-and-white films
1930s English-language films
1930s American films